Thulukhanam Shanmugham (19 June 1920 – 13 December 2012) was an Indian footballer who represented his country in the 1952 Olympic Games.

Playing career
Born in Austin Town, Bangalore, Shanmugham played for Mysore State for most of his career, spurning offers to play for teams from Kolkata. He was a gold medalist at the first Asian Games in 1951.

Coaching career
Shanmugham was part of the first batch of coaches that came out of the National Institute of Sports, Patiala, in 1961. He was also one of the earliest to attend the 93-day FIFA coaching under Dettmar Cramer in Tokyo in 1969.  He was the coach of four Santosh Trophy winning sides and won two Federation Cup victories as manager of Salgaocar. He was also a national selector.

Career outside football
Shanmugham was a police officer by profession and served the Mysore city police for 35 years, working as a security officer to two state governors.

Honours

Player

India
Asian Games Gold medal: 1951

Mysore
Santosh Trophy: 1946–47, 1952–53

Manager

Salgaocar
Federation Cup: 1988–89, 1989–90

Mysore
Santosh Trophy: 1967–68, 1968–69

Goa
Santosh Trophy: 1982–83, 1983–84

References

External links
 
 sports-reference- Thulukhanam Shunmugham.  At both sites says that a player was born in 1924
 T. Shanmugham's obituary

1920 births
2012 deaths
Indian footballers
India international footballers
Olympic footballers of India
Footballers from Bangalore
Footballers at the 1952 Summer Olympics
Asian Games medalists in football
Footballers at the 1951 Asian Games
Medalists at the 1951 Asian Games
Asian Games gold medalists for India
Association football forwards
Indian football coaches
Indian football managers